The 1951–52 NBA season was the Olympians' 3rd season in the NBA.

Draft picks

Regular season

Season standings

Record vs. opponents

Game log

References

Indianapolis Olympians seasons
Indianapolis